Jadé Fadojutimi (born 1993) is a British painter. Fadojutimi lives and works in London, United Kingdom.

Early life and education 
Fadojutimi was born in London, England, in 1993, and is of Nigerian heritage. In 2015, she graduated with a BA from the Slade School of Fine Art, London. In 2017, she earned an MA from the Royal College of Art, London.

Inspiration 
After graduating from Slade, Fadojutimi took a trip to Japan. Her second encounter with Japanese culture took place in Kyoto, during a residency in 2016, which helped the artist process initial difficulties that came with integrating local culture. Expressing an ongoing interest in anime and Japanese landscapes, Fadojutimi returns five to six times a year to draw. As the artist reveals to Ocula Magazine in a 2020 interview: "Kyoto started so much for me, that's my whole painting language, and the country has this preciousness of a start."

Work 
Fadojutimi's abstract paintings are inspired by source material ranging from Japanese anime to Victoriana chairs, clothing and art history. Her paintings contain both abstract and figurative elements.

Collections 

 Tate Museum
 Institute of Contemporary Art Miami
 Walker Art Center
 Baltimore Museum of Art
 Hepworth Wakefield

References 

1993 births
21st-century British painters
21st-century British women artists
Alumni of the Royal College of Art
Alumni of the Slade School of Fine Art
British women painters
Living people
Painters from London